{{DISPLAYTITLE:C19H26O3}}
The molecular formula C19H26O3 may refer to:

 Bioallethrin
 Epimestrol
 Formestane
 Hydroxyandrostenedione
 11β-Hydroxyandrostenedione
 16α-Hydroxyandrostenedione
 7-Keto-DHEA
 11-Ketotestosterone
 Methoxyestradiols
 2-Methoxyestradiol
 4-Methoxyestradiol
 11β-Methoxyestradiol
 Nandrolone formate